Kersti Sarapuu (born 5 May 1954 in Põltsamaa, Jõgeva County) is an Estonian politician. She has been a member of the XIII and XIV Riigikogu.

In 1986 she graduated from Tallinn University of Technology in industry management and planning.

From 2005 to 2011 she was the mayor of Paide.

Since 2002 she is a member of Estonian Centre Party.

References

1954 births
21st-century Estonian women politicians
Estonian Centre Party politicians
Members of the Riigikogu, 2007–2011
Members of the Riigikogu, 2015–2019
Members of the Riigikogu, 2019–2023
Living people
People from Põltsamaa
Tallinn University of Technology alumni
Women mayors of places in Estonia
Women members of the Riigikogu